The École Libre des Hautes Études ( ‘Free School for Advanced Studies’) was a "university-in-exile" for French academics in New York during the Second World War. It was chartered by the French (the Free French) and Belgian governments-in-exile and located at the New School for Social Research. Its founders included Jean Wahl, Jacques Maritain, and Gustave Cohen, and it was supported by the Rockefeller Foundation.

The philosopher Jacques Maritain, anthropologist Claude Lévi-Strauss, historian Elias Bickerman, and linguist Roman Jakobson all taught at the École Libre. 

According to Louis Menand, in "The Free World (p. 203)" it was started in 1942 through the efforts of Alvin Johnson, co-founder and director of the New School.

See also
École des Hautes Études en Sciences Sociales

References

Sources
 Aristide R. Zolberg, "The Ecole Libre at the New School 1941-1946", Social Research, Winter 1998: at HighBeam Encyclopedia, at FindArticles
 Menand, Louis. The Free World (p. 203). Farrar, Straus and Giroux. Kindle Edition.

Inline citations

Universities and colleges in New York City